Dániel Bereczki (born 2 June 1996) is a Hungarian football player who plays for the Hungarian team DEAC as a midfielder.

Club statistics

Updated to games played as of 24 June 2020.

External links 
MLSZ 
HLSZ 

1995 births
Sportspeople from Debrecen
Living people
Hungarian footballers
Hungary youth international footballers
Association football midfielders
Debreceni VSC players
Létavértes SC players
Kazincbarcikai SC footballers
Nemzeti Bajnokság I players
Nemzeti Bajnokság II players